The John J. Abel Award is an annual award presented by the American Society for Pharmacology and Experimental Therapeutics (ASPET). The award is given for outstanding research in the field of pharmacology and/or experimental therapeutics; which comes with a $5000 prize, An engraved plaque, and all travel expenses paid to attend the ASPET Annual Meeting at Experimental Biology. The Award is named after American biochemist and pharmacologist, John Jacob Abel.

Recipients 
1947 George Sayers
1948 J. Garrott Allen
1949 Mark Nickerson
1950 George B. Koelle
1951 Walter F. Riker, Jr.
1952 David F. Marsh
1953 Herbert L. Borison
1954 Eva King Killam
1955 Theodore M. Brody
1956 Fred W. Schueler
1957 Dixon M. Woodbury
1958 H. George Mandel
1959 Parkhurst A. Shore
1960 Jack L. Strominger
1961 Don W. Esplin
1962 John P. Long
1963 Steven E. Mayer
1964 James R. Fouts
1965 Eugene Braunwald
1966 Lewis S. Schanker
1967 Frank S. LaBella
1968 Richard J. Wurtman
1969 Ronald Kuntzman
1970 Solomon H. Snyder
1971 Thomas R. Tephly
1972 Pedro Cuatrecasas
1973 Colin F. Chignell
1974 Philip Needleman
1975 Alfred G. Gilman
1976 Alan P. Poland
1977 Jerry R. Mitchell
1978 Robert J. Lefkowitz
1979 Joseph T. Coyle
1980 Salvatore J. Enna
1981 Sydney D. Nelson
1982 Theodore A. Slotkin
1983 Richard J. Miller
1984 F. Peter Guengerich
1985 P. Michael Conn
1986 Gordon M. Ringold
1987 Lee E. Limbird
1988 Robert R. Ruffolo, Jr.
1989 Kenneth P. Minneman
1990 Alan R. Saltiel
1991 Terry D. Reisine
1992 Frank J. Gonzalez
1993 Susan G. Amara
1994 Brian Kobilka
1995 Thomas M. Michel
1996 John D. Scott
1997 David J. Mangelsdorf
1998 Masashi Yanigasawa
1999 Donald P. McDonell
2000 William C. Sessa
2002 Steven A. Kliewer
2003 David S. Bredt
2004 David Siderovski
2005 Randy A. Hall
2006 Christopher M. Counter
2007 Michael D. Ehlers
2008 Katerina Akassoglou
2009 John J. Tesmer
2010 Russell Debose-Boyd
2011 Laura M. Bohn
2012 Jin Zhang
2013 Arthur Christopoulos
2014 Craig W. Lindsley
2015 Pieter C. Dorrestein
2016 Jing Yang
2017 Samie R. Jaffrey
2018 Kirill A. Martemyanov
2019 Namandjé Bumpus
2020 Andrew Goodman
2021 Michael R. Bruchas
2022 Mikel Garcia-Marcos

References 

Awards established in 1947
Pharmacy awards
Pharmacology